Sanjay Chauhan is a communist politician who remained the Mayor of Shimla Municipal Corporation from May 2012 to June 2017.

Early life
He joined SFI (Student Federation of India) in college and later became a member of CPI(M).

Career
Sanjay Chauhan had contested on CPI(M) ticket from Shimla in 2003 Vidhan Sabha election. But he had lost to Congress candidate by a slender margin of around 1900 votes.

Shimla district secretary of CPI(M)
As district secretary of CPI(M) Chauhan defended the rights of street vendors and opposed the move of Congress government to evict them.

Mayor of Shimla
Sanjay Chauhan became the mayor, beating BJP's SS Minhas by 7,868 votes in 2012 elections. Tikender Singh Panwar of CPM became the Deputy Mayor who beat BJP rival Digvijay Singh by 4,748 votes. Sanjay Chauhan was the first Mayor of Shimla from CPI(M)

References

Year of birth missing (living people)
Communist Party of India (Marxist) politicians from Himachal Pradesh
People from Shimla
Living people
Mayors of places in Himachal Pradesh
Himachal Pradesh municipal councillors